Hex Hector (born Héctor Ortiz on April 15, 1965) is an American music producer and remixer. He won a Grammy Award in 2001 for Best Remixer. He was born in Manhattan, New York, of a Puerto Rican mother and Cuban father.

Discography

Original productions

Remixes

References

External links

1965 births
American dance musicians
American electronic musicians
American entertainers of Cuban descent
American house musicians
American people of Puerto Rican descent
Club DJs
Grammy Award winners
Hispanic and Latino American musicians
Living people
Musicians from New York City
People from Washington Heights, Manhattan
Record producers from New York (state)
Remixers